Austria competed at the 1984 Winter Paralympics in Innsbruck, Austria. 59 competitors from Austria won 70 medals including 34 gold, 19 silver and 17 bronze and finished 1st in the medal table.

Alpine skiing 

The medalists are:

  Rainer Bergmann, Men's Alpine Combination LW2
  Rainer Bergmann, Men's Downhill LW2
  Rainer Bergmann, Men's Giant Slalom LW2
  Helmut Falch, Men's Alpine Combination LW1
  Helmut Falch, Men's Downhill LW1
  Helmut Falch, Men's Giant Slalom LW1
  Helmut Falch, Men's Slalom LW1
  Odo Habermann, Men's Giant Slalom B2
  Edith Hoelzl, Women's Alpine Combination B2
  Edith Hoelzl, Women's Downhill B2
  Brigitte Madlener, Women's Alpine Combination LW5/7
  Brigitte Madlener, Women's Downhill LW5/7
  Brigitte Madlener, Women's Giant Slalom LW5/7
  Josef Meusburger, Men's Alpine Combination LW4
  Josef Meusburger, Men's Giant Slalom LW4
  Josef Meusburger, Men's Slalom LW4
  Karl Preining, Men's Alpine Combination B1
  Karl Preining, Men's Downhill B1
  Karl Preining, Men's Giant Slalom B1
  Veronika Preining, Women's Downhill B1
  Markus Ramsauer, Men's Downhill LW4
  Marianne Reiter, Women's Slalom LW2
  Dietmar Schweninger, Men's Giant Slalom LW6/8
  Christine Winkler, Women's Alpine Combination LW2
  Christine Winkler, Women's Downhill LW2
  Christine Winkler, Women's Giant Slalom LW2
  Rainer Bergmann, Men's Slalom LW2
  Christian Haeusle, Men's Downhill LW2
  Michael Knaus, Men's Slalom LW6/8
  Gerhard Langer, Men's Slalom LW3
  Brigitte Madlener, Women's Slalom LW5/7
  Josef Meusburger, Men's Downhill LW4
  Peter Perner, Men's Alpine Combination LW2
  Veronika Preining, Women's Alpine Combination B1
  Marianne Reiter, Women's Downhill LW2
  Christine Winkler, Women's Slalom LW2
  Gabriele Berghofer, Women's Giant Slalom B2
  Gerlinde Dullnig, Women's Downhill LW6/8
  August Hofer, Men's Downhill B2
  Gerhard Langer, Men's Alpine Combination LW3
  Gerhard Langer, Men's Giant Slalom LW3
  Peter Perner, Men's Giant Slalom LW2
  Veronika Preining, Women's Giant Slalom B1
  Markus Ramsauer, Men's Slalom LW4
  Dietmar Schweninger, Men's Downhill LW6/8
  Meinhard Tatschl, Men's Giant Slalom LW6/8
  Elisabeth Zerobin, Women's Alpine Combination LW4
  Elisabeth Zerobin, Women's Slalom LW4

Cross-country 

The medalists are:

  Doris Campbell, Margaret Heger, Renata Hoenisch, Marianne Kriegl Women's 4x5 km Relay B1-2
  Hildegard Fetz, Women's Middle Distance 5 km grade II
  Hildegard Fetz, Women's Short Distance 2.5 km grade II
  Georg Freund, Men's Middle Distance 10 km grade II
  Georg Freund, Siegwald Mussger, Reinhold Sager Men's 3x2.5 km Relay grade I-II
  Georg Freund, Men's Short Distance 5 km grade II
  Reinhold Sager, Men's Middle Distance 10 km grade I
  Reinhold Sager, Men's Short Distance 5 km grade I
  Hermann Gaun, Josef Siebenhofer, Reinhold Wessely Men's 3x2.5 km Relay grade I-II
  Margaret Heger, Women's Middle Distance 10 km B1
  Margaret Heger, Women's Short Distance 5 km B1
  Horst Morokutti, Men's Middle Distance 10 km LW5/7
  Siegwald Mussger, Men's Middle Distance 10 km grade II
  Siegwald Mussger, Men's Short Distance 5 km grade II
  Johanna Ratzinger, Women's Middle Distance 5 km grade II
  Johanna Ratzinger, Women's Short Distance 2.5 km grade II
  Doris Campbell, Women's Middle Distance 10 km B1
  Renata Hoenisch, Women's Middle Distance 10 km B2
  Peter Kieweg, Men's Middle Distance 10 km LW9
  Peter Kieweg, Men's Short Distance 5 km LW9
  Horst Morokutti, Men's Short Distance 5 km LW5/7

Ice sledge speed racing 

One athlete won a medal:

  Reinhold Wessely Men's 1500 m grade II

See also 

 Austria at the Paralympics
 Austria at the 1984 Winter Olympics

References 

Austria at the Paralympics
1984 in Austrian sport
Nations at the 1984 Winter Paralympics